Stevie Kremer (born 1982) is an American ski mountaineer and long-distance runner.

Kremer was born in Bad Soden, Germany. She attended  Darien High School, and afterwards Colorado College. She lives in Crested Butte, Colorado, and works as a second-grade teacher at the Crested Butte Community School.

Selected results

Ski mountaineering 
 2012:
 3rd, North American Championship, individual
 3rd, North American Championship, total ranking
 6th, North American Championship, sprint

Running 
2016
 1st, Olympus Marathon, Greece (44 km)
2014
 1st, Matterhorn Ultraks 46 km Skyrace, Switzerland (46 km)
 1st, Sierre-Zinal Mountain Race, Switzerland (31 km) 
2013
 1st, Limone Extreme Skyrace, Italy (23.5 km)
 2nd, Sierre-Zinal Mountain Race, Switzerland (31 km)
 1st, Hermannslauf, Germany (31.1 km)
 1st, Marathon du Mont Blanc, France
2012
 1st, Jungfrau Marathon, Switzerland; World Long Distance Mountain Running Challenge
 2nd, Sierre-Zinal Mountain Race, Switzerland (31 km)
 1st, Mount Evans Ascent, Idaho Springs, CO (14.5 miles); Women's Course Record
 1st, Golden Leaf Half Marathon; Aspen, CO
 2011:
 1st, Barr Trail Mountain Race (USTAF championship)
 1st and course record, Lead King Loop (25 km)
 1st, Golden Leaf Half Marathon; Aspen, CO
 1st, Greenland Trail Race (25 km); Women's Course Record

References

External links 
 Race results, Athlinks
 Race results , Hermannslauf

1982 births
Living people
American female ski mountaineers
American female long-distance runners
Colorado College alumni
American female marathon runners
American sky runners
World Long Distance Mountain Running Championships winners
21st-century American women